Zak Tales is a children's television program created in 1990 by DIC Enterprises.  Episodes consisted of a group of children meeting with "Zak" in a clubhouse setting to hear stories with subtle moral messages.

Episodes
 Richest Witch
 The Little Green Engine
 Greedy Humpty Dumpty
 Little Rabbit
 Space Race
 Yankee Doodle
 Fun at the Fair
 Joey the Little Red Car
 Simple Simon
 George Peorgie
 Mickey Koala
 The Hot Air Balloon
 The Circus Is Here

Cast
 Voices of Zak and Kilroy: Michael Donovan

Merchandise
 One video was released in 1991 in the UK and Australia by Tempo Video (UK/AU) and Pickwick Video (AU) featuring two episodes "Greedy Humpty Dumpty" and "Simple Simon".

Television series by Sesame Workshop
American television shows featuring puppetry
1990s American anthology television series
1990s American children's television series
1990 American television series debuts
1990 American television series endings
American children's education television series
Reading and literacy television series
Television series by DIC Entertainment
Television series by DHX Media
English-language television shows